Đorđe Krstić also Djordje Krstić (19 April 1851 – 30 October 1907) was a Serbian realist painter and academic. He is often ranked alongside his contemporaries, Paja Jovanović and Uroš Predić.

Biography
Krstić finished his education in Munich, Germany, where he began his early works under the influence of German realism up until 1883. Some significant works of this early period include The Drowning Maiden, Anatomist, and The Gospel Writer. In Serbia, Krstić moved his style of painting from a realist tone to a more idyllic one, with paintings such as Kosovo Field Landscape, From the Surroundings of Čačak, From Leskovac, Studenica, and Žiča. In his later years, Krstić began painting a number of iconostases in Čurug and Niš, working with architect Mihailo Valtrović, of which include the controversial Death of Prince Lazar.

Krstić painted more than 50 works based on Serbian folk art and traditional clothing.

Legacy
He is included in The 100 most prominent Serbs list.

Gallery

See also
 List of painters from Serbia
 Serbian art

References

 Rastko Directory

1851 births
1907 deaths
People from Kanjiža
Serbian painters
Academy of Fine Arts, Munich alumni
19th-century Serbian painters
Serbian male painters
19th-century Serbian male artists